John Arthur Arrowsmith Maund (19 October 1909 – 1998) was the first Anglican Bishop of Lesotho from 1950 until 1976.

Personal life
Maund was born in Worcester to Arthur Arrowsmith Maund, and died in Malvern, Worcestershire. He was educated at Leeds University and, after a period of study at the  College of the Resurrection, Mirfield, was ordained in 1934.

Clerical career
His first post was as a Curate at All Saints and St Laurence, Evesham after which he emigrated to South Africa to work at the Pretoria Native Mission. When World War II came he served as a Chaplain to the Forces and was mentioned in despatches. After peace returned he was at the St Peter′s parish in Lady Selborne, Pretoria before his appointment to the episcopate.

In retirement he continued to serve the church as an assistant bishop within the Diocese of St Edmundsbury and Ipswich.

References

External links

University of the Witwatersrand

1909 births
1998 deaths
English Anglicans
Alumni of the University of Leeds
Alumni of the College of the Resurrection
Anglican bishops of Lesotho
World War II chaplains
20th-century Anglican Church of Southern Africa bishops
Royal Army Chaplains' Department officers
British emigrants to South Africa